The Château de Vigny is a château in the commune of Vigny, Val d'Oise, France. It was built in 1504 on the site of a mediaeval structure for Cardinal Georges d'Amboise, with substantial alterations in the 1880s in the troubadour style for its then owner, Comte Philippe Vitali, Prince of Sant'Eusebio. It was entered ("inscrit") as a monument historique in 1984.

References

External links

Further reading
 Claude Danis, 2002: Châteaux et manoirs en Val d'Oise, pp. 88–89. Editions du Valhermeil: Saint-Ouen-l'Aumône
 

Châteaux in Val-d'Oise